Jennifer Joan Fowler (born 14 April 1939) is a British composer of Australian birth. She was born in Bunbury, Australia, and graduated with a Bachelor of Arts in music and a Bachelor of Music from the School of Music, University of Western Australia in 1960 and 1967, respectively. During her time at University of Western Australia, she won several composition prizes and received the University Convocation Awards for outstanding results. While a student, her pieces were performed in the Festival of Perth and broadcast by ABC. She spent a year working at the Electronic Music Studios of the University of Utrecht in 1968. In 1969 she settled in London and works as a free-lance composer. Fowler married computer programmer Bruce Paterson and has two sons.

Honors and awards
1970 Prize from the Academy of the Arts in Berlin
1971 Joint winner of the Radcliffe Award of Great Britain
1975 1st prize in the International Competition for Women Composers in Mannheim, Germany
2001 Eat and Be Eaten won a High Commendation at the Paul Lowin Song Cycle Awards
2003 Miriam Gideon prize from the International Association of Women in Music
2006 2nd prize in the Christopher Bodman Memorial Competition, UK
2009 International Sylvia Glickman Memorial Prize
2009 Winner of the Marin Goleminov First International Composition Contest in Bulgaria

Works
Selected works include:
Lament for Dunblane, for chorus
Magnificat, for chorus
Nunc Dimittis, for chorus
Blow Flute
Towards Release, duo for violin and marimba
Piece for an Opera House, for piano duo
Cycling for solo piano
Streaming Up for 4 bassoons and piano
Echoes from an Antique Land
Plainsong for Strings for string orchestra

Her works have been recorded and issued on CD, including:
The Flute Ascendant (1992), Vox
Sydney Dreaming, ABC Classics
Lines Spun (2019), Metier MSV28588

References

1939 births
Living people
20th-century classical composers
British music educators
Australian music educators
Australian women classical composers
British classical composers
Australian classical composers
20th-century British composers
Women music educators
20th-century women composers